Harri Pesonen (born August 6, 1988) is a Finnish professional ice hockey left winger for the SCL Tigers of the National League (NL). He previously played in the NL with Lausanne HC and in the Kontinental Hockey League (KHL) with Metallurg Magnitogorsk and Ak Bars Kazan.

Playing career
Undrafted, Pesonen joined the Devils after seasons with Finnish Liiga club, JYP Jyväskylä.

On March 16, 2013, Pesonen made his NHL debut playing with the New Jersey Devils in a loss against the Montreal Canadiens.

After two seasons within the Devils organization and as a restricted free agent, Pesonen signed a two-year contract with Swiss club Lausanne HC of the NLA on May 20, 2014.

On May 8, 2020, Pesonen left the SCL Tigers as a free agent and agreed to a two-year contract with Russian club, Metallurg Magnitogorsk of the Kontinental Hockey League (KHL). In the following 2020–21 season, Pesonen appeared in 33 regular season games with Metallurg, producing six goals and 14 points before he was mutually released from his contract on December 10, 2020. He was later signed for the remainder of the season to continue in the KHL with Ak Bars Kazan on December 24, 2020.

On June 14, 2021, Pesonen returned to Switzerland and the Tigers as a free agent, agreeing to a two-year deal through the 2022–23 season.

Personal
Pesonen's brother Jussi also is a professional hockey player.

Career statistics

Regular season and playoffs

International

References

External links

1988 births
Living people
Ak Bars Kazan players
Albany Devils players
Finnish expatriate ice hockey players in Switzerland
Finnish expatriate ice hockey players in the United States
Finnish ice hockey left wingers
JYP Jyväskylä players
Lausanne HC players
Metallurg Magnitogorsk players
New Jersey Devils players
People from Muurame
SCL Tigers players
Undrafted National Hockey League players
Ice hockey players at the 2022 Winter Olympics
Olympic ice hockey players of Finland
Medalists at the 2022 Winter Olympics
Olympic gold medalists for Finland
Olympic medalists in ice hockey
Sportspeople from Central Finland
Finnish expatriate ice hockey players in Russia